"China Girl" is a song written by Iggy Pop and David Bowie during their years in Berlin, first appearing on Pop's debut solo album, The Idiot (1977). The song became more widely known when it was re-recorded by Bowie, who released it as the second single from his most commercially successful album, Let's Dance (1983). The UK single release of Bowie's version reached No. 2 for one week on 14 June 1983, while the US release reached No. 10.

Original recording
Paul Trynka, the author of the David Bowie biography Starman, explains the song was inspired by Iggy Pop's infatuation with Kuelan Nguyen, a Vietnamese woman, as a metaphor for his Stooges career.

As for production, the original recording that appeared on The Idiot is raw and unpolished compared to Bowie's hit remake in 1983.

Nile Rodgers, the producer of David Bowie's 1983 version of the song, offered his own interpretation of the lyrics: "I figured China Girl was about doing drugs ... because China is China White which is heroin, girl is cocaine. I thought it was a song about speedballing. I thought, in the drug community in New York, coke is girl, and heroin is boy. So then I proceeded to do this arrangement which was ultra pop. Because I thought that, being David Bowie, he would appreciate the irony of doing something so pop about something so taboo. And what was really cool was that he said 'I love that!'."

Track listing
"China Girl" (Edit) (David Bowie, Iggy Pop)  – 3:26
"Baby" (Bowie, Pop) – 3:24

Personnel
Iggy Pop – vocals
David Bowie – synthesizers, saxophone and toy piano
Phil Palmer – lead guitar
Carlos Alomar – rhythm guitar
George Murray – bass
Dennis Davis – drums

David Bowie version

Music video
The music video, featuring New Zealand model Geeling Ng, was directed by David Mallet and shot mainly in the Chinatown district of Sydney, Australia. Along with his previous single's video for "Let's Dance" with the critique of racism in Australia, Bowie described the video as a "very simple, very direct" statement against racism. The video consciously parodies Asian female stereotypes. It depicts a hypermasculine protagonist in an interracial romance. The original video release includes the two lying naked in the surf (a reference to the film From Here to Eternity). Unedited versions were banned from New Zealand and some other countries at the time. The uncensored version was issued on the 1984 "Video EP" issued by Sony on Betamax, VHS, and LaserDisc. Versions of the video included on subsequent video and DVD compilations (including EMI/Virgin's Best of Bowie) are censored to remove the nudity. The original video went on to win an MTV video award for Best Male Video.

Reception
BBC Online reviewer David Quantick acknowledged the effect of Nile Rodgers's production on the song, arguing that "nobody but Rodgers could have taken a song like 'China Girl', with its paranoid references to 'visions of swastikas', and turned it into a sweet, romantic hit single." The success of Bowie's cover reportedly led to Pop gaining financial stability via his co-writer residuals.  Cash Box said that it provided "a nice balance to the controlled frenzy of" Bowie's previous single "Let's Dance" with its "softer vocals and minimal instrumentation" and also said that the song is "neatly [framed]" by "an oriental-style riff."

Live performances
The song was regularly included in Bowie's live shows for the rest of the 1980s and appeared on concert videos in 1983 and 1988 – Serious Moonlight and Glass Spider, respectively. It was rehearsed for Bowie's appearance at the 1985 London Live Aid concert but was dropped due to time constraints, along with the songs "Fascination" and "Five Years". Additional live versions of the song appear on 2009's release of a 1999 performance for VH1 Storytellers, on a 2010 release, entitled A Reality Tour, recorded at Bowie's November 2003 concerts in Dublin, Ireland, and on 2018's Glastonbury 2000, recorded at the Glastonbury Festival in June 2000.

Track listing
7-inch single
"China Girl" (Edit) (David Bowie, Iggy Pop)  – 4:14
"Shake It" (Bowie) – 3:49

12-inch single
"China Girl" (Bowie, Pop)  – 5:32
"Shake It" (Re-Mix) (Bowie) – 5:21

Personnel
David Bowie – vocals
Stevie Ray Vaughan – lead guitar
Nile Rodgers – rhythm guitar
Carmine Rojas – bass
Robert Sabino – synthesizers
Omar Hakim – drums

Production
Nile Rodgers – producer

Chart performance

Weekly charts

Year-end charts

Certifications

Other releases
 The song has appeared on the following Bowie compilations:
 Changesbowie (1990)
 The Singles Collection (1993, released as Bowie: The Singles 1969–1993 in the United States)
 Best of Bowie (2002)
 The Best of David Bowie 1980/1987 (2007)
 Nothing Has Changed (2014)
 Bowie Legacy (2016)
 Loving the Alien (1983–1988) (2018)
 The soundtrack for the film The Wedding Singer featured "China Girl"
 The original Iggy Pop version is included on Pop's compilation A Million in Prizes: The Anthology

Later versions
 James Cook – Ashes to Ashes: A Tribute to David Bowie (1998)
 Tripwires – Under the Covers (compilation album) (2014)
 Pete Yorn - “Musicforthemorningafter” Expanded Edition (2001)

References 

Sources

External links

1977 singles
1983 singles
David Bowie songs
MTV Video Music Award for Best Male Video
Iggy Pop songs
Songs written by David Bowie
Songs written by Iggy Pop
Song recordings produced by David Bowie
Song recordings produced by Nile Rodgers
Songs against racism and xenophobia
British new wave songs
1977 songs
RCA Records singles
EMI Records singles
EMI America Records singles
Songs about China
Songs about East Asian people
Music videos directed by David Mallet (director)